The men's 1500 metres at the 2014 World Junior Championships in Athletics was held at Hayward Field from 22 to 24 July.

Medalists

Records

Results

Final
24 July
Start time: 20:39  Temperature: 21 °C  Humidity: 53 %

Intermediate times:
400m: 58.23 Hillary Cheruiyot Ngetich
800m: 2:01.31 Jonathan Kiplimo Sawe
1200m: 3:00.03 Jonathan Kiplimo Sawe

Heats
22 July
First 3 in each heat (Q) and the next 3 fastest (q) advance to the Final

Summary

Details
First 3 in each heat (Q) and the next 3 fastest (q) advance to the Final

Heat 1
24 July
Start time: 11:43  Temperature: 20 °C  Humidity: 60%

Intermediate times:
400m: 58.96 Jonathan Kiplimo Sawe
800m: 2:00.28 Jonathan Kiplimo Sawe
1200m: 3:00.00 Jonathan Kiplimo Sawe

Heat 2
24 July
Start time: 11:52  Temperature: 20 °C  Humidity: 60%

Intermediate times:
400m: 1:02.33 Filip Sasínek
800m: 2:07.37 Jack Stapleton
1200m: 3:05.42 Thiago André

Heat 3
24 July
Start time: 12:00  Temperature: 20 °C  Humidity: 60%

Intermediate times:
400m: 1:03.30 Hillary Cheruiyot Ngetich
800m: 2:08.14 Abdi Waiss Mouhyadin
1200m: 3:07.86 Zak Patterson

Participation
According to an unofficial count, 33 athletes from 24 countries participated in the event.

References

External links
 WJC14 400 metres schedule

1500 metres
1500 metres at the World Athletics U20 Championships